The Ministry of Foreign Affairs is the Ethiopian government ministry which oversees the foreign relations of Ethiopia.

The current ministry was established 23 August 1995 with the passing of Proclamation 4-1995, which also established the other 14 original ministries. The current Minister of Foreign Affairs is Demeke Mekonnen, since 4 November 2020.

List of ministers
This is a list of Ministers of Foreign Affairs of Ethiopia:

1907–1910: Negadras Haile Giyorgis Woldemikael
1910–1911: Negadras Yigezu Behabte
1912: Fitawrari Habte Giyorgis Dinagde 
1912–1916: Dejazmatch Beyene Yimer
1916–1917: Ras Mulugeta Yeggazu
1917: Tsehafi Taezaz Wolde Meskel Tariku 
1917–1930: Ras Tafari Makonnen
1930–1936: Blattengeta Heruy Wolde Selassie
1941–1942: Blattengeta Lorenzo Taezaz
1942–1943: Blattengeta Ephrem Teweldemedhin 
1943–1958: Tsehafi Taezaz Aklilu Habte-Wold 
1953: Dr. Ambaye Wolde Mariam 
1958–1960: Yilma Deressa
1960–1961: Haddis Alemayehu
1961: Mikael Imru
1961–1971: Ketema Yifru
1971–1974: Minasse Haile
1974: Dejazmatch Zewde Gebre-Sellassie
1974–1977: Kifle Wodajo
1977–1983: Feleke Gedle-Giorgis
1983–1986: Goshu Wolde
1986–1989: Berhanu Bayeh
1989–1991: Tesfaye Dinka
1991: Tesfaye Tadesse
1991–2010: Seyoum Mesfin
2010–2012: Hailemariam Desalegn
2012: Berhane Gebre-Christos 
2012–2016: Tedros Adhanom
2016–2019: Workneh Gebeyehu
2019–2020: Gedu Andargachew
2020–present: Demeke Mekonnen

See also

Foreign aid to Ethiopia
List of diplomatic missions of Ethiopia
List of diplomatic missions in Ethiopia

Notes

External links
Ministry of Foreign Affairs of Ethiopia
Ministry of Youth & Sport of Ethiopia

Foreign
Foreign relations of Ethiopia
Ethiopia
Ministries established in 1907